Tomonohana Shinya (born 23 June 1964 as Shinya Narimatsu) is a former sumo wrestler from Yatsushiro, Kumamoto Prefecture, Japan. His highest rank was komusubi. He is now a sumo coach.

Career
He had been an amateur sumo champion at Nihon University but worked as a high school physical education teacher after graduation. He did not join the professional sport until March 1992, when he was nearly 28, an extraordinarily late age. (The Sumo Association have since changed its rules and all former amateurs must now make their professional debuts before the age of 25). He made his debut in the third highest makushita division, fighting out of Tatsunami stable. He began wrestling under his own surname of Narimatsu, but upon reaching sekitori status he adopted the formal shikona of Tomonohana, meaning "flower of wisdom."

Tomonohana had winning records or kachi-koshi in his first twelve tournaments, reaching the second highest jūryō division in November 1992 and the top makuuchi division in July 1993. A popular wrestler, he was nicknamed "Sensei" because of his teaching background. He used a wide variety of techniques to counteract his light weight, and won the prestigious Ginō-shō, or technique prize, in two consecutive tournaments in September and November 1993. In January 1994 he reached the sanyaku ranks at komusubi, but turned in the first losing record of his career, 4–11, and never made the rank again. He was demoted back to jūryō in March 1996 and subsequent injuries prevented him from returning to the top division. Nevertheless, he carried on fighting until November 2001 when he announced his retirement at the age of 37.

Fighting style
Tomonohana preferred a migi-yotsu or right hand inside, left hand outside grip on his opponent's mawashi, and his speciality was shitatenage, or underarm throw, which was his most common winning kimarite. He used 34 different kimarite during his career, some of them extremely rare. In January 1993 he defeated Hananokuni with izori, or backwards body drop, a technique that had not been seen at sekitori level since 1964.

Retirement from sumo
Upon his retirement he temporarily used his old fighting name as an elder, under the jun-toshiyori system. In February 2003 he switched to the elder name of Asakayama owned by former ōzeki Kaiō, after it was vacated by ex-maegashira Ōwakamatsu who left the Sumo Association. He transferred from Tatsunami stable to coach at Tomozuna stable in April 2005. In March 2006 he obtained the Tamagaki stock upon the mandatory retirement of its previous owner, the former Wakanami.

Career record

See also
Glossary of sumo terms
List of past sumo wrestlers
List of sumo elders
List of komusubi

References

External links

1964 births
Living people
People from Yatsushiro, Kumamoto
Japanese sumo wrestlers
Sumo people from Kumamoto Prefecture
Nihon University alumni
Komusubi